The Italian Society of Authors and Publishers, commonly known by its acronym SIAE, is the Italian copyright collecting agency. Founded in 1882 in the Kingdom of Italy, it is the monopolist intermediary between the authors of musical tracks and consumers, managing the economic aspects and the distribution of money from royalties of Italian-copyrighted music to authors and on their behalf. In the 2000s and 2010s, SIAE is known for the controversial decision to claim payment through the "Private Copy Siae Tax" for every blank CD, DVD, and HDD sold in Italy since 2001. From 2013 to February 2015, the main spokesperson of the SIAE organization was the songwriter Gino Paoli, who was the president of the society. Paoli resigned after he was investigated for tax evasion; Filippo Sugar was then appointed as a president. The current president is Mogol, famous Italian lyricist.

History

Foundation and early years: 1882–2014

The SIAE was founded by a selfmade statute in Milan, Kingdom of Italy, on 23 April 1882. Among the first notably names to join the Corporation there were the Italian poet Giosuè Carducci (1835–1907) and the Italian musician Giuseppe Verdi (1813–1901). SIAE is ruled by the law Siae Copyright, no.633/1941 in 1941, emanated in Rome, Kingdom of Italy.

Resignation of the President for tax evasion: February 2015 – March 2015

In February 2015, Police raided the residence of the President of the SIAE association Gino Paoli to probe an illicit two millions euro transfer to a Swiss bank in 2009 for tax evasion.

Filippo Sugar SIAE President and his Conflict of interest: March 2015

After the dimission of the former SIAE President for tax evasion investigation, SIAE elected as new president Filippo Sugar.

The new SIAE president said that SIAE isn't meant for grant equal rights for everyone, he is also the owner of the music label Sugar Music Spa

EU's Law to terminate the SIAE money collecting monopoly: 2016

The European Parliament decided that the SIAE monopoly on the preventive taxation of the storage media, TVs and smartphones was to end by April 2016.

In March 2023, SIAE removed music by SIAE's songwriters from Meta platforms Facebook and Instagram.

Deposit at SIAE
SIAE exercises the author's right on behalf of their legitimate owners. Authors' right has two distinct components: economic and moral.
Italian law does not require a deposit since Berne Convention provides that the rights are first acquired upon creation of the work and therefore it is possible to prove the ownership by other means such as Copyzero.
According to Article 180 bis, subscription is mandatory only for cable retransmission (not such a widespread technology in Italy), while broadcasting, both via radio and television, is not included.

Subscription
Authors can entrust the management of their work to SIAE both by association and mandate. Authors can address the Associates and Principals Service and the Public Relations Office through form n. 483. Associates have a right to run as candidates and to vote for the corporate bodies of the society, for the board of directors and for the supervisory committee. They have to pay an annual fee as opposed to Principals, who have to renew the copyright protection every four years and are allowed to subscribe to Music, Opera and DOR (theatre, radio and television works) Sections through form n. 489 and to Cinema and OLAF (visual arts and literary works) Sections through form n. 487. Non-EU authors, publishers and dealers are not allowed to become associates and therefore have to give mandate to SIAE in order to get legal protection for their works. Minors can subscribe for free through form n. 488. The mandate expires on 31 December of the author's eighteenth year.

Pseudonyms and stage names
Upon payment, associates are allowed to register their works under a pseudonym or a stage name. Though from an etymological perspective, there is not a big difference between pseudonyms and stage names, SIAE claims that pseudonyms are mere alternatives to birth names while a stage name is instantly recognizable to both fans and media. Protecting a work of art under a stage name is cheaper than protecting it under a pseudonym, but the authors need to supply the documentation (newspaper articles, websites, posters) proving that they're really famous under that specific name.

Deposit of works
In order to deposit their works, the authors need to deliver to the closest SIAE office an application form signed by all the authors and an unpublished copy of the work through a form called "modello 112", available in all SIAE offices in Italy. Associates can deposit musical works for free. When depositing audiovisual works, the case containing the work must be signed too. SIAE also requires the author to present the payment notification for the registration.

Musical work registration
In order to protect musical works, the creators need to be registered to SIAE. If the musical work arises from the creativity of a group of people, each member needs to be registered. If some of the members are not associated neither to SIAE nor to foreign institutions connected with SIAE, a "dichiarazione liberatoria form" for non-members is required in order to allow the rightholders to manage the work.
In order to register a song, authors need to fill the work registration form ("modello 112"), also attaching the music score (at least the melody transcription) and lyrics. Needless to say, a full music score is easier to identify. For electronic or concrete music or, only in exceptional cases, chamber or symphonic music, that cannot be transcribed into readable notation, it is possible to deposit the recording. Members' names and their specific creative role must result from the score and from the registration form.
The international confederation of Authors' Societies connected with SIAE enables the protection of works outside Italy. These societies collect revenues depending on their fees, detract their commission and hand over the remaining part to SIAE, which in turn distributes it between the rightholders (authors, record producers, performers).

Phonogram production and SIAE
According to copyright law, record companies use musical works for commercial purposes by recording, reproducing and selling them. Since SIAE acts as a mediator, record producers (who hold the economic rights according to article 72 of the Legge 22 Aprile 1941, n. 633, on the subject of "Copyright protection and other related rights"), must affix the SIAE sticker to the record and must deposit royalties to SIAE, which in turn is responsible for distributing them between authors and publishers of the work.
If the company deals both with record production and musical publishing, it will be required to deposit royalties on one hand, while, on the other, will benefit from the same royalties as a SIAE associate (the publisher owns the copyright, by virtue of the contracts with the authors, and thus is one of the rightholders).

SIAE and Creative Commons
SIAE bans its associates from using Creative Commons Licenses.
On 23 December 2008, a mixed legal working group, composed of both SIAE and Creative Commons Italia members was announced. The aim of the group was to allow the authors to choose free and easy-to-use licenses, keeping the commercial use to themselves, and relying on SIAE only for distribution and collection of revenues, but nothing came of it.
The first example of Creative Commons license integrated with a copyright collecting agency was born in the Netherlands and paved the way to more flexible licenses, leaving authors free to use and advertise their works.
This choice depended on the new frontiers of computer science, that allowed the authors to publish their works online, which would have been a sort of theft according to previous rules.
The only solution for those who wanted to distribute their works online for free, was Creative Commons licence that was able to protect them from plagiarism for commercial purposes, thanks to its "non-commercial" clause. Thus the artist was able to take advantage of Internet speed to advertise his work, making profit from merchandising and live performances.
Therefore, the artists are now able to release a work under a "non-commercial" Creative Commons licence in order to protect and distribute it and have the chance to make commercial use of it while Buma/Stemra, the Netherland equivalent of SIAE, is responsible for collecting and distributing the revenues.

Results
SIAE's financial results were subject matter for discussion.
Over the past three years, as evidenced in the Reports of Management approved by the Ministry of Economy and Finance and by the Ministry of Culture, a positive trend for the net income has been registered. The result for the years 2013 to 2015 is positive: in detail 1.6 million Euros in 2013, 3.5 million euro in 2014 and to EUR 0.31 million in 2015 have been registered.

Income

Preventive taxation
Since 2001, SIAE collects a private copying levy, called Equo compenso ("Fair fee"), on media storage devices sold in Italy, assuming in advance that the user will store a private copy of copyright protected material.  The preventive taxation is applied on photographic film, tape, VHSs, CDs, DVDs, HD DVDs, Blu-ray Discs, optical disc drives, hard disk drives, USB flash drives, memory cards, personal computers, set-top boxes, digital media players, mobile phones, etc.
The total amount of revenues collected is estimated by Confindustria and Assinform (Italian Tassociation of information technology) at €300 million per year. Despite this, SIAE declares that it is not fully satisfied with the amount currently established by the decree as it is not totally "fair".

On 27 November 2013, the Italian Minister Massimo Bray (Beni Culturali) supported the decision to establish new taxes, with revenue going to the SIAE, for certain electronic goods, such as HDTVs and PVRs.  This is controversial since there is no direct connection between paying the SIAE and purchasing a new HDTV or a PVR.

On 15 December 2013, it's revealed that the SIAE organization had a hand in writing the new amendment to the law resulting in increased revenues of about €150,000,000 during 2014 from the tax on smart TVs, PVRs, hard disks, blank DVDs, CDs and smartphones (all goods that are sold without media content bundled, so the ratio legis is inconsistent).

Taxation on non-lucrative events or activities
SIAE may claim compensation for non-profit events.  There have been several emblematic cases that raised criticism, for example payment requests to associations for singing traditional songs at impromptu parties, a payment request for the rental of the score of the Italian Republic's national anthem, a request of a flat rate payment for photocopying tasks in university libraries.
The claim of SIAE to request copyright compensation for educational activities has been discussed in the Italian Government by the Italian senator Mauro Bulgarelli, who proposed to extend the concept of "fair use" in Italy.

Taxation on movie trailers
In October 2011, the SIAE began requiring a license fee from websites hosting movie trailers, which had been considered "fair use" for promotional purposes. This license, starting at €1000 per year, would be required even if the trailer is embedded and resides on another site. This decision raised many doubts and criticism even by well-known directors and actors and caused the withdrawal of the video content on some sites.

Distribution

All music songwriters and composers in Italy must send a mandate document to the SIAE or s/he must be an SIAE subscriber (registration fee is €129.59 and annual fees are €151.81).
Authors who choose to register as associates can (with additional payment) register their works under a pseudonym or professional name.
All CD Albums sold in Italy must have an adhesive label affixed directly on the CD jewel case.
The mandatory fee paid to the SIAE, grants permission to musicians, bands and DJs to cover songs or play Italian copyrighted music.

Imbalances in royalty distribution and member rights
 65% of artists registered with the SIAE receive royalties totalling less than their registration fees.
 The influence of a vote in assembly decisions is not the same for all members, but varies according to the amount of royalties received by the member.
 SIAE plays a major role in the "Comitato consultivo permanente per il diritto d'autore" (Permanent Advisory Committee of copyright) according to rules established under the corporate law.
 SIAE is a legal monopoly in Italy, granted by the State to perform mediation activities.  The issue of the actual fairness of such a position has been repeatedly raised.  Some institutions, such as the FIMI, ask for an amendment in favor of a more competitive market.

Unequal redistribution of revenues
The money the SIAE receives from the music royalties redistribution system is regulated by SIAE itself. A large part of the management rights for music tracks is entirely entrusted to the SIAE, which is also entrusted with safeguarding the interests of musicians. The phenomenon of a State granting exclusive intermediation activities to a single group that has been active since 1882, is currently happening only in Italy.

In 2013, the largest portion of income (€46,000,000) was redistributed to only 146 artists. Michele Guardì, the director of Italian TV shows Uno Mattina and Domenica In broadcast by Italy's national public broadcasting company RAI (owned by the Ministry of Economy and Finance) earned the majority of the SIAE income in 2013. He received even more money from the SIAE than popular Italian singers Vasco Rossi and Luciano Ligabue.

Competitors
Soundreef is an alternative to SIAE since 2011, both Italian singers J-Ax, Fedez, Ruggeri works with this company and has left SIAE in 2017.

See also
 Copyright law of Italy

References

External links
 

Music licensing organizations
Music organisations based in Italy
1882 establishments in Italy
Companies established in 1882